The 2020 Gran Piemonte was the 104th edition of the Gran Piemonte (known as Giro del Piemonte until 2009) single-day cycling race. It was held on 12 August, over a distance of 187 km, starting in Santo Stefano Belbo and ending in Barolo.

Teams
Eighteen teams were invited to take part in the race. These included eleven UCI WorldTeams, six UCI ProTeams and the Italian national team.

National team
 Italy

Results

References

Gran Piemonte
2020 in Italian sport
Giro del Piemonte
2020 UCI ProSeries